Rafael Vega (born 22 August 1951) is a Colombian racewalker. He competed in the men's 20 kilometres walk at the 1976 Summer Olympics.

References

1951 births
Living people
Athletes (track and field) at the 1971 Pan American Games
Athletes (track and field) at the 1975 Pan American Games
Athletes (track and field) at the 1976 Summer Olympics
Colombian male racewalkers
Olympic athletes of Colombia
Place of birth missing (living people)
Central American and Caribbean Games medalists in athletics
Pan American Games competitors for Colombia
20th-century Colombian people